Riley Emilia Voelkel (born April 26, 1990) is an American-born Canadian actress. She is known for portraying Freya Mikaelson on The CW television series The Originals and Legacies. Voelkel also played the role of Jenna Johnson on the HBO television series The Newsroom. In 2013, she played the younger version of Jessica Lange's character, the witch Fiona Goode in the FX series American Horror Story: Coven.

Early life
Voelkel was born in Elk Grove, California but raised in Calgary, Alberta.

Just a month away from going to college, a modeling scout came to her town and she decided to try her luck. The scout picked her and she went to Los Angeles where she was very much liked by several agents. She moved to Los Angeles to model, but, soon after, she joined an acting class recommended by an agent.

Career
Voelkel's first role was of a club girl in The Social Network, winning the part by audition. Afterwards, she signed with an agent, and booked her first starring role, as Carrie in the independent film, The Secret Lives of Dorks, released in 2013. In 2012, she joined the HBO series The Newsroom only for the pilot episode, but later became the character of Jenna. In 2014, she was cast as one of the leads in the Amazon pilot Point Of Honor.

In the fall 2014, Voelkel was cast in an unnamed recurring role on The CW series The Originals during its second season. Her character on The Originals, Freya Mikaelson, was upgraded to a series regular for the show's third season.

Filmography

Film

Television

References

External links
 
 

1990 births
Living people
21st-century American actresses
Actresses from Calgary
Actresses from California
Canadian film actresses
Canadian television actresses
People from Elk Grove, California